Katie: Portrait of a Centerfold is a 1978 American television film about a Texas beauty queen, seeking Hollywood stardom, who learns the realities of the business after attending an unethical modeling school.

Cast
Kim Basinger as Katie McEvera
Vivian Blaine as Marietta Cutler
Fabian as Emcee
Tab Hunter as Elliot Bender
Don Johnson as Gunther
Virginia Kaiser as Deborah Pintoff
Dorothy Malone as Myrtle Cutler
Nan Martin as Aunt Isabel
Melanie Mayron as Madelaine
Terri Nunn as Cindy Holland
Don Stroud as Sullie Toulours
Glynn Turman as Preston de Cordiva
Kristine DeBell as Sally South

References

External links

1978 television films
1978 films
1978 drama films
1970s English-language films
Films set in Texas
Films about beauty pageants
American drama television films
1970s American films